William Ball (9 April 1886 – 30 September 1942) was an English professional footballer who played as a full back. He was born in the Woodside area of Dudley, Worcestershire, and played for Birmingham both before and after the First World War. He made 165 appearances in all competitions and helped them win the Second Division championship in 1920–21. He played once for England in 1919, a Victory international against Wales in which he sustained an injury and was unable to complete the match.

References

1886 births
Sportspeople from Dudley
1942 deaths
English footballers
England wartime international footballers
Association football fullbacks
Stourbridge F.C. players
Leamington F.C. players
Telford United F.C. players
Birmingham City F.C. players
Cannock Town F.C. players
English Football League players
Place of death missing